Newport is a town in Orleans County, Vermont, in the United States. The population was 1,526 at the 2020 census. The town is referred to by the United States Postal Service and the media as Newport Center, the name of the main settlement of the town.

Government

Town

 Selectman – Steve Barrup
 Selectman – Richard Gosselin
 Selectman – Gerry Waterman
 Town Clerk – Denise Daigle
 Road Commissioner – Fred Baraw
 Zoning Administrator – Doug Lay
 Member, Planning Commission – Dan Boone

School District

 Member, School Board (2007–2009) – Kristin Grenier
 Member, School Board (2007–2010) – Wilma Therrien
 Member, School Board – Conrad Bellavance
 Budget – $2,400,000

Geography
According to the United States Census Bureau, the town has a total area of 43.5 square miles (112.6 km2), of which 41.7 square miles (108.0 km2) is land and 1.8 square miles (4.6 km2) (4.07%) is water.

The unincorporated village of Newport Center is located roughly in the geographic center of town. The town also contains a smaller, secondary settlement, South Newport, located in the southern part of town.

History
Newport was formed on October 26, 1781, and chartered under the name of Duncansboro, to George Duncan, Nathan Fisk, and sixty-three others on October 30, 1802. Amos Sawyer, Enos Bartlett, James C. Adams were the first town selectman. Amos Sawyer was also the first Town Clerk. These were among the first settlers of Duncansboro. The name was altered from Duncansboro to Newport, October 30, 1816.

The first clearing, which began where Newport Center now is, was made by H. & A. Adams and D. & S. Meacham. Here they constructed a dam and put up a waterwheel saw-mill on mud creek. Amos Sawyer, a carpenter by trade, built a home nearby. Two other settlements were established in the town: South Newport and Pickeral Point, later renamed to Lake Bridge (named for its location at the head of Lake Memphremagog). By the late 19th century, the Boston and Maine and Central Vermont railroads were routed through Lake Bridge and the small village experienced a population boom. In 1868, the Lake Bridge settlement was incorporated as the "Village of Newport". The main town village, Newport Center, was also incorporated in 1908.

In 1917, the Village of Newport separated from the Town of Newport and merged with the Village of West Derby (in the town of Derby) to form the City of Newport. In 1931, by special acts of the General Assembly, the Village of Newport Center consolidated with the Town of Newport, with its former responsibilities automatically assumed by the town.

Demographics

As of the census of 2000, there were 1,511 people, 587 households, and 436 families residing in the town. The population density was 36.2 people per square mile (14.0/km2). There were 746 housing units at an average density of 17.9/sq mi (6.9/km2). The racial makeup of the town was 97.35% White, 0.26% Black or African American, 0.73% Native American, 0.26% Asian, 0.07% Pacific Islander, and 1.32% from two or more races. Hispanic or Latino of any race were 0.53% of the population.

There were 587 households, out of which 33.0% had children under the age of 18 living with them, 62.0% were married couples living together, 7.8% had a female householder with no husband present, and 25.6% were non-families. 19.1% of all households were made up of individuals, and 5.5% had someone living alone who was 65 years of age or older. The average household size was 2.57 and the average family size was 2.93.

In the town, the population was spread out, with 26.5% under the age of 18, 5.8% from 18 to 24, 28.5% from 25 to 44, 27.8% from 45 to 64, and 11.4% who were 65 years of age or older. The median age was 39 years. For every 100 females, there were 103.1 males. For every 100 females age 18 and over, there were 102.4 males.

The US Census Bureau estimates that the town's population increased 19.1% between 2000–2005, the second largest increase in the state of Vermont.

Economics

Personal Income
The median income for a household in the town was $34,758, and the median income for a family was $43,828. Males had a median income of $28,063 versus $21,389 for females. The per capita income for the town was $17,677. About 10.1% of families and 12.7% of the population were below the poverty line, including 19.1% of those under age 18 and 4.1% of those age 65 or over.

Notable people 

 Charles Adams, first owner of the Boston Bruins, First National Stores, the Boston Braves, and Suffolk Downs
 Josiah Grout, 46th governor of Vermont; represented Newport in the legislature 1872–1876
 George "Spike" Hamilton, bandleader.
 Glenn D. Lowry, director of MoMA; summer

See also

 Lake Memphremagog
 Newport (city), Vermont

References

 
Towns in Vermont
Towns in Orleans County, Vermont